St. George's Church used to be a catholic church in Riga, the capital of Latvia. The church building now houses the Latvian Museum of Decorative Arts and Design and is situated at the address 10/12 Skārņu Street.

References 

Roman Catholic churches in Latvia